Charles John Brand (October 24, 1879 – 1949) was Chief of the Bureau of Markets at the United States Department of Agriculture in Washington, DC.

Biography
In 1913 he was a physiologist in charge of the Farmers' Cooperative Cotton. He resigned from the United States Department of Agriculture in 1925. In 1933 he left his job at the National Fertilizer Association to act as co-administrator for the Agricultural Adjustment Administration for a four-month period.

Publications
Yearbook of agriculture (1913)

References

United States Department of Agriculture officials
1879 births
1949 deaths